Mathieu Deplagne (born 1 October 1991) is a French professional footballer who plays as a right-back.

Career
Deplagne started his career with Montpellier HSC, with whom he won the Ligue 1 championship in the 2011–2012 season.

In June 2017 Deplagne left Montpellier HSC to sign a three-year contract with Ligue 1 rivals Troyes AC.

On 19 December 2018, MLS side FC Cincinnati announced they had signed Deplagne ahead of their 2019 season. As of 30 March 2019, Deplagne has started and played 90 minutes for FC Cincinnati in every regular season match to date. He scored his first Major League Soccer goal on 17 March in the 63rd minute of FCC's home opener against Portland Timbers. He was released by Cincinnati at the end of their 2020 season.

On 8 April 2021, Deplagne joined San Antonio FC in the USL Championship.

Honours
Montpellier
 Ligue 1: 2011–12
 Coupe Gambardella (youth): 2009

References

External links
 
 
 Eurosport profile

1991 births
Living people
Association football defenders
French expatriate sportspeople in the United States
French expatriate footballers
Expatriate soccer players in the United States
French footballers
Ligue 1 players
Montpellier HSC players
ES Troyes AC players
FC Cincinnati players
Major League Soccer players
San Antonio FC players